In Cantabria, there is a big number of fortified towers that fulfilled functions of housing and defense. These buildings, generally battlements, were erected mostly between the 13th and 15th centuries by noble families and influenced significantly in the architecture of Cantabria, passing some to be forts-houses, prelude to the future casona montañesa. A curious fact is that there are not in the region circular towers (except in some churches), as yes happens in the neighboring community of Asturias. Currently of the towers that survives several are in a deplorable condition.

The towers and castles that appear in medieval documents as castellum were very popular both as fortress as residences of nobles, mayors and gentlemen, and eventually generalized in the lower valleys of Cantabria, building on the hills and in the towns; one of the best examples of urban towers resulted in towns is the missing Torre de la Vega genesis of Torrelavega.

The defensive towers of Cantabria, for its architectural features, can only be compared with those of Enkarterri comarca of Biscay surrounding.

Evolution of the Cantabrian towers

Highmedieval fortifications 
In the territory currently occupied by Cantabria can distinguish three stages in the medieval military architecture. The first, around the 7th and 12th centuries, is documented with an about twenty of sites that correspond with small castles, presumably linked to respective alfozes, and are the first organization in the Cantabrian territory not monastic nature. These castles are arranged in high places, easily defensible and often visible to each other. At the end of the stage, the new castles, related to the founding of the four villas (Castro Urdiales, Santander, Laredo and San Vicente de la Barquera), there are more complex and are located in the same urban centers. Successively renovated, staged centuries later in the third phase with the walls around the villas

From 13th century, with the gradual increase of feudal power, appear across all Cantabria a large number of towers, more or less fortified, covering the entire territory and still are preserved enough samples. In the late Middle Ages there is only one instance in Cantabria leaking of this type, the Castle of Argüeso.

The medieval tower 
On low medieval stage the family fortifications splashed the Cantabrian geography with buildings designed to defend the coast and protection against war of the bands It is isolated towers built between the late 12th century and early 15th, which meet certain military function and watchtower over the territory. Its respond to a style Gothic, in many occasions late, and did not show up in urban centers.

Its have, as common features, square plants and walls of masonry with reinforcements of ashlar, narrow windows and mullioned or ensaetadas, usually a single entry and wood floors. Usually it has three to four floors, being the services in the lower (cellar, salting), a banquet and reception at the first and stately premises on successive; The main staircase was located near the entrance and was usually of wood. Probably each floor was free of divisions, except for the tapestries that hid the stately bed, and found no traces of partitions. Some possessed wall and pit. In some cases virtually all walls are of masonry. The entry was a lowered arch flanked by loopholes; inside, a staircase from beside it two sections per floor attached to front progresses. The overall volume has few voids and creates a heaviness. The decor is virtually nonexistent. Normally its were topped by battlements. Inside an open wall near the window, with a bench, covered by a segmental arch 

The inner structure consisted of a central wooden trunk holding a large wooden beam on each floor, from which was forged between it and the stone walls. Only sometimes an inner wall of masonry on which to forge, replacing the wooden pillar.

In some cases, few, these towers were surrounded by a high barbican that made it seem castles at the style of Álava. The existence or not of these defense systems (ramparts, moats, countermoats, corbels, etc.) marks the typological difference of the towers.

The tower-house 
The stately fortresses kept the medieval typologies along the 16th century although face to these, modern housing conjugated Gothic tradition of cubic volume, developed in height, with greater openness to own outside of modern palaces.
From 16th century, with the union of the Catholic Monarchs, which brings a longer period of peace in the region, no longer interests the military function, but the towers are still being built and preserved as a sign of stately power. That's when appears the tower-house typical of Cantabria and expand or modify some existing watchtowers.

These are binoculars and lower turrets, sometimes reinforced with corner barrels. Its evolution will result in the 18th century to casona montañesa, typical example of Cantabrian palace. So some Baroque palaces, such as of Soñanes, were built respecting the ruins of ancient medieval towers.

 Destruction of the tower houses
It is known that the king Henry IV of Castile sent down in 1403 the Tower of Arce; others were demolished by order of the Catholic Monarchs, speculated that were enough, as happened in Gipuzkoa and Galicia. The truth is that in 1437 Henry IV began a campaign to bring down those castles, fortresses and tower-houses built with no royal license. The tower houses of Gipuzkoa were ordered demolished in the year 1457. In 1500, Isabella and Ferdinand continued that legacy 

In this list appears towers, fortified towers and tower-houses (fortified houses) of Cantabria built between 12th and 17th centuries. Are not listed castles of the region; when appears the nickname castle refers to the popular name, which does not reflect the true type.

See also 

 Cantabria
 Nine Valleys lawsuit

References

Bibliography 
 Fortified towers of Cantabria

Architecture in Spain
History of Cantabria
Fortifications in Spain
Cantabria
Former towers
Lists of buildings and structures in Spain